Reinaldo da Cruz Oliveira  or simply  Reinaldo  (born 14 March 1979 in Itaguaí, Brazil) is a retired Brazilian footballer who played as a forward.

On 11 July 2019 it was announced, that Reinaldo had retired.

Honours

 Flamengo
 Campeonato Carioca: 1999, 2000, 2001
 Taça Guanabara: 1999, 2001
 Taça Rio: 2001

 Botafogo
 Taça Guanabara: 2009
 Libertadores: 2020

 Brasiliense
 Campeonato Brasiliense: 2017

References

External links

Futpédia 

1979 births
Living people
Brazilian footballers
Brazilian expatriate footballers
Kashiwa Reysol players
JEF United Chiba players
J1 League players
Expatriate footballers in Japan
Campeonato Brasileiro Série A players
Santos FC players
CR Flamengo footballers
São Paulo FC players
Botafogo de Futebol e Regatas players
Figueirense FC players
Esporte Clube Bahia players
Paraná Clube players
Clube Atlético Metropolitano players
Esporte Clube Internacional de Lages players
Luverdense Esporte Clube players
Paris Saint-Germain F.C. players
Ittihad FC players
Suwon Samsung Bluewings players
FC Goa players
Boavista Sport Club players
Brasiliense Futebol Clube players
Ligue 1 players
K League 1 players
China League One players
Expatriate footballers in South Korea
Brazilian expatriate sportspeople in South Korea
Guangdong Sunray Cave players
Expatriate footballers in China
Brazilian expatriate sportspeople in China
Expatriate footballers in France
Brazilian expatriate sportspeople in France
Expatriate footballers in India
Brazilian expatriate sportspeople in India
Association football forwards
Saudi Professional League players